In mathematics, a Lie groupoid is a groupoid where the set  of objects and the set  of morphisms are both manifolds, all the category operations (source and target, composition, identity-assigning map and inversion) are smooth, and the source and target operations

are submersions.

A Lie groupoid can thus be thought of as a "many-object generalization" of a Lie group, just as a groupoid is a many-object generalization of a group. Accordingly, while Lie groups provide a natural model for (classical) continuous symmetries, Lie groupoids are often used as model for (and arise from) generalised, point-dependent symmetries. Extending the correspondence between Lie groups and Lie algebras, Lie groupoids are the global counterparts of Lie algebroids.

Lie groupoids were introduced by Charles Ehresmann under the name differentiable groupoids.

Definition and basic concepts 
A Lie groupoid consists of

 two smooth manifolds  and 
 two surjective submersions  (called, respectively, source and target projections)
 a map  (called multiplication or composition map), where we use the notation 
 a map  (called unit map or object inclusion map), where we use the notation 
 a map  (called inversion), where we use the notation 

such that

the composition is associative, i.e.  for every  for which the composition is defined

The notation  is also frequently used, especially when stressing the simplicial structure of the associated nerve.

In order to include more natural examples, the manifold  is not required in general to be Hausdorff or second countable (while  and all other spaces are).

Alternative definitions 
Such definition proved to be too weak and was replaced by Pradines with the one currently used.

First properties 
The fact that the source and the target map of a Lie groupoid  are smooth submersions has some immediate consequences:
 the -fibres , the -fibres , and the set of composable morphisms  are submanifolds;
 the inversion map  is a diffeomorphism;
the unit map  is a smooth embedding;
the isotropy groups  are Lie groups;
 the orbits  are immersed submanifolds;
 the -fibre  at a point  is a principal -bundle over the orbit  at that point.

Subobjects and morphisms 
A Lie subgroupoid of a Lie groupoid  is a subgroupoid  (i.e. a subcategory of the category ) with the extra requirement that  is an immersed submanifold. As for a subcategory, a (Lie) subgroupoid is called wide if . Any Lie groupoid  has two canonical wide subgroupoids:

 the unit/identity Lie subgroupoid ;
 the inner subgroupoid , i.e. the bundle of isotropy groups (which however may fail to be smooth in general).

The kernel  of a morphism between Lie groupoids over the same base manifold is automatically a normal Lie subgroupoid.

The quotient  has a natural groupoid structure such that the projection  is a groupoid morphism; however, unlike quotients of Lie groups,  may fail to be a Lie groupoid in general. Accordingly, the isomorphism theorems for groupoids cannot be specialised to the entire category of Lie groupoids, but only to special classes.

A Lie groupoid is called abelian if its isotropy Lie groups are abelian. For similar reasons as above, while the definition of abelianisation of a group extends to set-theoretical groupoids, in the Lie case the analogue of the quotient  may not exist or be smooth.

Bisections 

The group of bisections can be given the compact-open topology, as well as an (infinite-dimensional) structure of Fréchet manifold compatible with the group structure, making it into a Fréchet-Lie group.

A local bisection  is defined analogously, but the multiplication between local bisections is of course only partially defined.

Examples

Trivial and extreme cases 
Lie groupoids  with one object are the same thing as Lie groups.
Given any manifold , there is a Lie groupoid  called the pair groupoid, with precisely one morphism from any object to any other.
Given any manifold , there is a Lie groupoid  called the unit groupoid, with precisely one morphism from one object to itself, namely the identity, and no morphisms between different objects.
For instance, any vector bundle is a bundle of abelian groups, so it is in particular a(n abelian) Lie groupoid.

Constructions from other Lie groupoids 

Examples from differential geometry 
Given a submersion , there is a Lie groupoid , called the submersion groupoid or fibred pair groupoid, whose structure maps are induced from the pair groupoid  (the condition that  is a submersion ensures the smoothness of ). If  is a point, one recovers the pair groupoid.
For instance, if  is the trivial vector bundle of rank , then  is the action groupoid.
Any principal bundle  with structure group  defines a Lie groupoid , where  acts on the pairs  componentwise, called the gauge groupoid. The multiplication is defined via compatible representatives as in the pair groupoid.
On the other hand, when  is a simple foliation, i.e. the foliation by (connected) fibres of a submersion , its holonomy groupoid is precisely the submersion groupoid  but its monodromy groupoid may even fail to be Hausdorff, due to a general criterion in terms of vanishing cycles. In general, many elementary foliations give rise to monodromy and holonomy groupoids which are not Hausdorff.
Given any pseudogroup , there is a Lie groupoid , called its germ groupoid, endowed with the sheaf topology and with structure maps analogous to those of the jet groupoid. This is another natural example of Lie groupoid whose arrow space is not Hausdorff nor second countable.

Important classes of Lie groupoids 
Note that some of the following classes make sense already in the category of set-theoretical or topological groupoids.

Transitive groupoids 
A Lie groupoid is transitive (in older literature also called connected) if it satisfies one of the following equivalent conditions:

 there is only one orbit;
 there is at least a morphism between any two objects;
 the map  (also known as the anchor of ) is surjective.

Gauge groupoids constitute the prototypical examples of transitive Lie groupoids: indeed, any transitive Lie groupoid is isomorphic to the gauge groupoid of some principal bundle, namely the -bundle , for any point . For instance:

 the trivial Lie groupoid  is transitive and arise from the trivial principal -bundle . As particular cases, Lie groups  and pair groupoids  are trivially transitive, and arise, respectively, from the principal -bundle , and from the principal -bundle ;
 an action groupoid  is transitive if and only if the group action is transitive, and in such case it arises from the principal bundle  with structure group the isotropy group (at an arbitrary point);

As a less trivial instance of the correspondence between transitive Lie groupoids and principal bundles, consider the fundamental groupoid  of a (connected) smooth manifold . Accordingly,  inherits a smooth structure which makes it into a Lie groupoid.

A stronger notion of transitivity requires the anchor  to be a surjective submersion. Such condition is also called local triviality, because  becomes locally isomorphic (as Lie groupoid) to a trivial groupoid over any open  (as a consequence of the local triviality of principal bundles).

When the space  is second countable, transitivity implies local triviality. Accordingly, these two conditions are equivalent for many examples but not for all of them: for instance, if  is a transitive pseudogroup, its germ groupoid  is transitive but not locally trivial.

Proper groupoids 
A Lie groupoid is called proper if  is a proper map. As a consequence

 the orbit space  is Hausdorff.

For instance:

 a Lie group is proper if and only if it is compact;
 pair groupoids are always proper;
unit groupoids are always proper;
 an action groupoid is proper if and only if the action is proper;
the fundamental groupoid is proper if and only if the fundamental groups are finite.
As seen above, properness for Lie groupoids is the "right" analogue of compactness for Lie groups. One could also consider more "natural" conditions, e.g. asking that the source map  is proper (then  is called s-proper), or that the entire space  is compact (then  is called compact), but these requirements turns out to be too strict for many examples and applications.

Étale groupoids 
A Lie groupoid is called étale if it satisfies one of the following equivalent conditions:

  is a local diffeomorphism;
 all the -fibres are discrete

As a consequence, also the -fibres, the isotropy groups and the orbits become discrete.

For instance:

 a Lie group is étale if and only if it is discrete;
pair groupoids are never étale;
unit groupoids are always étale;
an action groupoid is étale if and only if  is discrete;
 fundamental groupoids are always étale (but fundamental groupoids of a foliations are not);
 germ groupoids of pseudogroups are always étale.

Effective groupoids 
An étale groupoid is called effective if, for any two local bisections , the condition  implies . For instance:

 Lie groups are effective if and only if are trivial;
unit groupoids are always effective;
In general, any effective étale groupoid arise as the germ groupoid of some pseudogroup. However, a (more involved) definition of effectiveness, which does not assume the étale property, can also be given.

Source-connected groupoids 
A Lie groupoid is called -connected if all its -fibres are connected. Similarly, one talks about -simply connected groupoids (when the -fibres are simply connected) or source-k-connected groupoids (when the -fibres are k-connected, i.e. the first  homotopy groups are trivial).

Note that the entire space of arrows  is not asked to satisfy any connectedness hypothesis. However, if  is a source--connected Lie groupoid over a -connected manifold, then  itself is automatically -connected.

For instanceː

 Lie groups are source -connected if and only are -connected;
 a pair groupoid is source -connected if and only if  is -connected;
 unit groupoids are always source -connected;
 action groupoids are source -connected if and only if  is -connected.
 monodromy groupoids (hence also fundamental groupoids) are source simply connected.

Further related concepts

Actions and principal bundles 
Accordingly, an action of a Lie groupoid  on a manifold  along a smooth map  consists of a groupoid action where the maps  are smooth. Of course, for every  there is an induced smooth action of the isotropy group  on the fibre .

Given a Lie groupoid , a principal -bundle consists of a -space  and a -invariant surjective submersion  such thatis a diffeomorphism. Equivalent (but more involved) definitions can be given using -valued cocycles or local trivialisations.

When  is a Lie groupoid over a point, one recovers, respectively, standard Lie group actions and principal bundles.

Representations 
A representation of a Lie groupoid  consists of a Lie groupoid action on a vector bundle , such that the action is fibrewise linear, i.e. each bijection  is a linear isomorphism.

Of course, any fibre  becomes a representation of the isotropy group . More generally, representations of transitive Lie groupoids are uniquely determined by representations of their isotropy groups, via the construction of the associated vector bundle.

Examples of Lie groupoids representations include the following:

 representations of Lie groups  recover standard Lie group representations
 representations of pair groupoids  are trivial vector bundles
 representations of unit groupoids  are vector bundles
 representations of action groupoid  are -equivariant vector bundles
 representations of fundamental groupoids  are vector bundles endowed with flat connections

The set  of isomorphism classes of representations of a Lie groupoid  has a natural structure of semiring, with direct sums and tensor products of vector bundles.

Differentiable cohomology 

More precisely, recall that the space  consists of strings of  composable morphisms, i.e.

and consider the map .

One denotes by  the space of such -cochains, and considers the differential , defined as

On the other hand, for any proper Lie groupoid , one can prove that  for every .

The Lie algebroid of a Lie groupoid 

Any Lie groupoid  has an associated Lie algebroid , obtained with a construction similar to the one which associates a Lie algebra to any Lie groupː

 the vector bundle  is the vertical bundle with respect to the source map, restricted to the elements tangent to the identities, i.e. ;

The Lie group–Lie algebra correspondence generalises to some extends also to Lie groupoids: the first two Lie's theorem (also known as the subgroups–subalgebras theorem and the homomorphisms theorem) can indeed be easily adapted to this setting.

For instance,

 given any connected manifold  its pair groupoid  is s-connected but not s-simply connected, while its fundamental groupoid  is.

However, there is no analogue of Lie's third theoremː while several classes of Lie algebroids are integrable, there are examples of Lie algebroids, for instance related to foliation theory, which do not admit an integrating Lie groupoid.

Morita equivalence
As discussed above, the standard notion of (iso)morphism of groupoids (viewed as functors between categories) restricts naturally to Lie groupoids. However, there is a more coarse notation of equivalence, called Morita equivalence, which is more flexible and useful in applications.

First, a Morita map (also known as a weak equivalence or essential equivalence) between two Lie groupoids  and  consists of a Lie groupoid morphism from G to H which is moreover fully faithful and essentially surjective (adapting these categorical notions to the smooth context).

A more explicit description of Morita equivalence (e.g. useful to check that it is an equivalence relation) requires the existence of two surjective submersions  and  together with a left -action and a right -action, commuting with each other and making  into a principal bi-bundle.

Morita invariance 
Many properties of Lie groupoids, e.g. being proper, being Hausdorff or being transitive, are Morita invariant. On the other hand, being étale is not Morita invariant.

Last, the differentiable cohomologies of two Morita equivalent Lie groupoids are isomorphic.

Examples 

 Isomorphic Lie groupoids are trivially Morita equivalent.
 Two Lie groups are Morita equivalent if and only if they are isomorphic as Lie groups.
Two unit groupoids are Morita equivalent if and only if the base manifolds are diffeomorphic.
 Any transitive Lie groupoid is Morita equivalent to its isotropy groups.

A concrete instance of the last example goes as follows. The Čech groupoid is in fact the pullback groupoid, under the obvious submersion , of the unit groupoid .

Smooth stacks 
Investigating the structure of the orbit space of a Lie groupoid leads to the notion of a smooth stack. For instance, the orbit space is a smooth manifold if the isotropy groups are trivial (as in the example of the Čech groupoid), but it is not smooth in general. The solution is to revert the problem and to define a smooth stack as a Morita-equivalence class of Lie groupoids. The natural geometric objects living on the stack are the geometric objects on Lie groupoids invariant under Morita-equivalence: an example is the Lie groupoid cohomology.

Since the notion of smooth stack is quite general, obviously all smooth manifolds are smooth stacks. Other classes of examples include orbifolds, which are (equivalence classes of) proper étale Lie groupoids, and orbit spaces of foliations.

References

Books
 
 
 
 
 

Differential geometry
Lie groups
 
Manifolds
Symmetry